This is a list of all episodes of the CBS television series Simon & Simon.

Series overview

Episodes

Season 1 (1981–82)

Season 2 (1982–83)

Season 3 (1983–84)

Season 4 (1984–85)

Season 5 (1985–86)

Season 6 (1986–87)

Season 7 (1987–88)

Season 8 (1988–89)

References

External links
 
 

Lists of mystery television series episodes
Lists of American comedy-drama television series episodes
Lists of American action television series episodes
Lists of American crime television series episodes